Uwe Timm (born 30 March 1940 in Hamburg) is a German writer.

Life and work

Uwe Timm was born in the year 1940 in Hamburg.
Uwe Timm was the youngest son in his family. His brother, 16 years his senior, was a soldier in the Waffen SS and died in Ukraine in 1943. Decades later, Uwe Timm approached his relationship with his father and brother in the critically acclaimed novel In my brother's shadow.

After working as a furrier, Timm studied Philosophy and German in Munich and Paris, achieving a PhD in German literature in 1971 with his thesis: The Problem of Absurdity in the Works of Albert Camus. During his studies, Timm was engaged in leftist activities of the 1960s. He became a member of the Socialist German Student Union and was associated with Benno Ohnesorg. From 1973 to 1981 he was a member of the German Communist Party. Three times Timm has been called as a writer-in-residence to several universities in English-speaking countries: in 1981 to the University of Warwick, in 1994 to Swansea, and in 1997 to Washington University in St. Louis. He has also been a lecturer at universities in Paderborn, Darmstadt, Lüneburg and Frankfurt.

Timm started publishing in the early 1970s and became known to a larger audience in Germany after one of his children's books, Rennschwein Rudi Rüssel, was turned into the movie  (1995). Today he is one of the most successful contemporary authors in Germany. His books Die Entdeckung der Currywurst (The Invention of Curried Sausage) and Am Beispiel meines Bruders (In my brother's shadow, or literally: "By my Brother's Example") can both be found on the syllabi of German schools. His readers usually appreciate Timm's writing style, which he himself calls "die Ästhetik des Alltags" ("the aesthetics of everyday life"). Timm imitates everyday storytelling by using everyday vocabulary and simple sentences and generally tries to imitate the way stories are orally told. His works often indirectly link with each other by taking up minor characters from one story and making this character the main character of another work. For example, a minor character like Frau Brücker from Johannisnacht is taken up as a main character in his book Die Entdeckung der Currywurst. Timm's works also tend to have autobiographical features and often deal with the German past or are set in the German past.

Awards
1995 Bavarian Film Award, Best Young People's Film
1990 Deutscher Jugendliteraturpreis for Rennschwein Rudi Rüssel
2009 Heinrich-Böll-Preis
2012 Carl Zuckmayer Medal
2021

Bibliography

Widersprüche, Poems (1971)
Heißer Sommer (1974)
Wolfenbüttlerstr. 57, Poems (1977)
Morenga (1978)
Kerbels Flucht (1980)
Die deutschen Kolonien, Photo book (1981)
Die Zugmaus, Children's book (1981)
Die Piratenamsel, Children's book (1983)
Der Mann auf dem Hochrad (1984)
Der Schlangenbaum (1986)
Rennschwein Rudi Rüssel, Children's book (1989)
Vogel, friss die Feige nicht (1989)
Der Kopfjäger (1991)
Die Piratenamsel, Children's book (1991)
Erzählen und kein Ende, A collection of speeches (1993)
Die Entdeckung der Currywurst (1993)
Der Schatz auf Pagensand (1995)
Johannisnacht (1996)
Nicht morgen, nicht gestern, Short stories (1999)
Rot, novel (2001), awarded the 2003 Schubart-Literaturpreis
Am Beispiel meines Bruders (2003)
Der Freund und der Fremde (2005)
Halbschatten (2008)
Freitisch (2011)
Vogelweide (2013)
Ikarien (2017)

English translations
 The Snake Tree, 1989
 Headhunter, 1994
 The Invention of Curried Sausage, 1995
 Midsummer Night, 1998
 Morenga, 2003
 In My Brother's Shadow: A Life and Death in the SS, 2005

References

External links
 David Basker: Uwe Timm, Cardiff 1999 (Contemporary German Writers).
 Hanjo Kersting, Axel Ruckaberle: "Uwe Timm", Kritisches Lexikon zur deutschsprachigen Gegenwartsliteratur (KLG), Köln 2004.

1940 births
Living people
Writers from Hamburg
German Communist Party members
Sozialistischer Deutscher Studentenbund members
20th-century German novelists
21st-century German novelists
German autobiographers
German male novelists
20th-century German male writers
21st-century German male writers
Members of the Academy of Arts, Berlin
German male non-fiction writers
Officers Crosses of the Order of Merit of the Federal Republic of Germany